Verconia purpurea is a species of colourful sea slug, a dorid nudibranch, a shell-less marine gastropod mollusk in the family Chromodorididae. It was first described in 1949 by Kikutaro Baba as Noumea purpurea.

The length of the body attains 20 mm.

Distribution 
This marine species occurs off subtropical Japan. It is also found on the Great Barrier Reef.

References

Further reading

External links
 

Chromodorididae
Gastropods described in 1949